Farewell and Chorley is a civil parish in Lichfield District, Staffordshire, England. The villages of Farewell and Chorley, that make up the parish, lie 3 or 4 miles north-west of the City of Lichfield. The parish council is a joint one with Curborough and Elmhurst.

Farewell Priory was founded by Roger de Clinton, Bishop of Lichfield and Coventry, (1129 – 48).

The parish church of St Bartholomew was rebuilt in brick in 1745, with the exception of the stone chancel.  There was further restoration in 1848 when the church was re-roofed. The church is a Grade II* listed building for its surviving medieval fabric and fittings.

See also
Listed buildings in Farewell and Chorley

References

Civil parishes in Staffordshire